Another Life is an American television soap opera produced and broadcast by The Christian Broadcasting Network from June 1, 1981 to October 5, 1984. It was co-created by Roy Winsor and Bob Aaron, and ran for 875 episodes. It attempted to combine standard afternoon intrigue with religious overtones, as many characters were portrayed as born again who relied on the power of prayer to solve their problems. Set in the fictional east coast town of Kingsley (ostensibly thought to be in Virginia), the show was taped in CBN's hometown of Virginia Beach, Virginia.

Synopsis
Through its run, Another Life revolved around the Davidson family - local anchorman Scott Davidson, his wife Terry who works as a nurse (Mary Jean Feton), daughter Lori (Jeannette Larson and later Debbie McLeod), and teenage son Peter (Darrel Campbell). Although they sometimes struggle with their faith, they stick by their principles, show compassion towards their fellow man - most notably next-door neighbor Liz Cummings (Carolyn Lenz) who lives with her alcoholic and adulterous husband Jeff (Tom McGowan) and their daughter Jenny - and eschew revenge to those who have caused them grief.

Wealthy businessman Charles Carpenter (Randy Kraft) attempts to control every situation with his power and influence, and holds a grudge against the Davidsons, particularly after Scott investigates a crime story involving a mob gang which has connections with Kingsley's upper-crust which includes the Carpenter family. Charles' daughter Miriam Mason (Ginger Burgett) also holds a grudge against the Davidsons, and files an adultery case against daughter Lori who is accused of having an affair with her husband Paul, a lecturer at the local college. Although it was later proved that Lori was innocent, Paul and Miriam get a divorce, with the latter losing custody of their son - although it is often hinted that Paul does indeed have feelings for Lori. Charles would later date Terry Davidson's half-sister, the equally nefarious Nancy Lawson (Nancy Mulvey) who also clashes with the Davidsons and uses her charms to lure wealthy men into relationships with her, but never appears to hold down a steady career.

Russ Weaver (Christopher Roland), a pre-medical student who is about to propose to Lori, finds himself tangled with the drug ring when he is left with a huge debt after paying his girlfriend's medical bills following a serious car accident the couple are involved in. He is also torn between Lori and fellow student Becky Hewitt (Sue Scannell) who is Lori's best friend. Unknown to Lori, Becky slept with Russ after the latter grew frustrated with Lori's refusal to have sex with him due to her beliefs. Lori would later catch the attention of Ben Martin, a handsome but older doctor who attends to Lori after her accident, and this infuriates Russ even after she breaks up with him. Russ's father is later revealed to be Vince Cardello, a member of the local mob.

Russ and Becky secretly marry shortly after she becomes lead singer of the rock band Summerwind. The lead guitarist and founder, Phil Hayes (Scott R. Brown), falls for her, thus creating tension in her relationship with Russ. Becky later becomes pregnant by Russ, but miscarries due to Summerwind's hectic schedule. After discovering Russ had cheated on her with another student, and that their wedding is not legal, Becky leaves Russ to pursue a solo singing career in New York.

The Davidsons are also close friends of the Redlons, an African American family which includes the deeply-religious Ione (Edye Byrde) and her son Gene (Eddie Hailey) who is Scott's colleague, and involved in a custody battle with his ex-wife Carla (Elain Graham) over their son Jimmy who is often stuck in the middle; the situation is not helped when Carla puts her singing career before her family. Jimmy is hospitalized following a drug overdose, but refuses to name his dealer. Scott and Gene realize there is a connection between the mob and drug ring and both vow to investigate, leading to their dismissal at work after their TV station receives threats.

Following the Cummings' departure from Kingsley more families are featured, including the Prescotts and the Phillips.

In a nod to how The Secret Storm began its story, Scott and Nora are killed in a car accident on New Year's Eve.

Production
One of the program's creators, Bob Aaron, left the show, after a dispute on one of the show's most heavy-handed moments when  Jeff was in the hospital suffering from cancer, and was miraculously healed when a beam of light entered his hospital room.  Declaring such soap writing "deplorable", Aaron quit the show soon after.

On the set
Eddie Hailey, who played the non-Christian part of Gene Redlon, is actually the son of a minister. At the time of making the series, he had been a born again for some time. He credited his rebirth into Christianity as a result of his failure to win the part of Alex Haley in Roots: The Next Generations. He started attending a Los Angeles church that Bob Dylan went to. One day, he was reading a Parish magazine saw something about Another Life and later successfully auditioned for a part.  While on the set of Another Life, he would lead the cast in a half hour prayer service each morning.

Title sequences and theme music
During its first nine months on the air, Another Life had a simple opening shot of a beach at sunrise. Brent Havens, who was the music director of CBN's signature show, The 700 Club, composed the theme music. The original opening and closing arrangement consisted of a trumpet solo, backed by quietly played strings and a Rhodes piano electric piano, which was a frequently used instrument in the show's music cues.

In March 1982, a new, jazzier opening was introduced. This sequence consisted of dramatic scenes from past episodes (which changed regularly), and close-ups of all the main characters. At the end of the montage, a shot of Terry praying in her kitchen dissolves into the sunrise beach scene from the original opening. A "hotlicks" version of Brent Havens' theme music was used for the new opening, but the quiet original arrangement continued to be used for the end credits, which featured stills from that day's episode.

Cancellation
In 1984, Another Life was cancelled due to low ratings and a shortage of advertising revenues. In its first year, 68 stations nationwide bought syndication rights to the show which reached an estimated 50,000,000 households daily, but as it entered its third year the number of stations buying the program had dropped to 25, and television ratings showed that Another Life was reaching just 500,000 households.

Airings
Reruns of the series were shown on Trinity Broadcasting Network during the late 1980s and early 1990s, but have not aired in the United States since. The show has aired in the United Kingdom on the GOD TV, and in the Middle East on Middle East Television. Episodes have also been uploaded onto YouTube, and the show remains popular in Africa, particularly in Nigeria; in an interview with The Punch, Nollywood producer/director Zeb Ejiro revealed Another Life had inspired his own soap opera Ripples. As of 2017, Another Life is broadcast in the Netherlands by Christian cable channel Family7.

Cast

Notable cast members
One of the show's more successful alumni Susan Scannell (Becky Hewitt), left after the first year to join the cast of Search for Tomorrow. Dee Dee Bridgewater had a minor role as Sam Marshall, Gene Redlon's boss and later love interest.

Additionally, Paul Gleason, who originated the role of troublemaker Lee Carothers, would go on to greater fame as high school principal Richard Vernon in the 1985 film The Breakfast Club.

References

External links
 

1981 American television series debuts
1984 American television series endings
American television soap operas
1980s American television series
Christian entertainment television series
English-language television shows
Television series created by Roy Winsor